Moritz von Bissing (9 September 1886 – 18 March 1954) was a German tennis player. He competed in the men's singles event at the 1908 Summer Olympics.

In 1913 he won the doubles title at the World Hard Court Championships partnering compatriot  Heinrich Kleinschroth.

References

External links
 

1886 births
1954 deaths
German male tennis players
Olympic tennis players of Germany
Tennis players at the 1908 Summer Olympics
Place of birth missing